Lissone (Brianzolo: Lisson) is a town and comune in the province of Monza and Brianza, Lombardy, Italy.

	
Lissone is bounded by the municipality of Vedano al Lambro, Monza, Muggiò, Desio, Seregno, Albiate, Sovico, Macherio and Biassono.

The city is served by the SS36- Highway of Lake of Como and Spluga and by the Milan–Chiasso railway line.

Lissone received the honorary title of city by a presidential decree on November 27, 1982.

Lissone is served by Lissone-Muggiò railway station.

People

 Pierantonio Tremolada, (born 1956) bishop of Brescia, born in Lissone

References